The Royal Red Cross (RRC) is a military decoration awarded in the United Kingdom and Commonwealth for exceptional services in military nursing.

Foundation
The award was established on 27 April 1883 by Queen Victoria, with a single class of Member and first awarded to the founder of modern nursing, Florence Nightingale. A second and lower class, Associate, was added during World War I in November 1915.

The award is made to a fully trained nurse of an officially recognised nursing service, military or civilian, who has shown exceptional devotion and competence in the performance of nursing duties, over a continuous and long period, or who has performed an exceptional act of bravery and devotion at her or his post of duty. It is conferred on members of the nursing services regardless of rank. Holders of the second class who receive a further award are promoted to the first class, although an initial award can also be made in the first class. Holders of the first class who receive a further award are awarded a bar.

The decoration was conferred exclusively on women until 1976, when men became eligible, with posthumous awards permitted from 1979.

Recipients of the Royal Red Cross are entitled to use the post-nominal letters "RRC" or "ARRC" for Members and Associates respectively.

Description
The words "Faith", "Hope" and "Charity" are inscribed on the upper limbs of the cross, with the year "1883" in the lower limb.The reverse is plain except a circular medallion bearing the royal cypher of the reigning monarch.
 The ribbon for both grades is dark blue with crimson edge stripes. The decoration is worn by women from the ribbon in the form of a bow, although it can be worn by both sexes in military uniform on a straight ribbon alongside other medals.  
 To recognise further exceptional devotion and competency in the performance of nursing duties or exceptional act of bravery and devotion at her or his post of duty, a bar may be awarded to a recipient of the RRC. The bar is linked to the cross and is made of red enamel. A rosette is worn on the ribbon in undress to denote a bar to the RRC.

See also
 :Category:Members of the Royal Red Cross
 British and Commonwealth orders and decorations

References

External links

Search recommendations for the Royal Red Cross on The UK National Archives' website.
 Royal Red Cross Medal
 Manufacturer of The Royal Red Cross

Military awards and decorations of the United Kingdom
1883 establishments in the United Kingdom
Awards established in 1883
Nursing awards
Nursing in the United Kingdom
Military nursing